Apocimmerites is a genus of beetles in the family Carabidae, containing the following species:

 Apocimmerites kubanicus Belousov, 1998
 Apocimmerites parallelus Belousov, 1998

References

Trechinae